The Jerusalem Municipality  (Iriyat yerushalayim), the seat of the Israeli municipal administration, consists of a number of buildings located on Jaffa Road in the city of  Jerusalem.

History

British Mandate town hall (1930)
Jerusalem's old town hall was built in 1930, during the British Mandate. The construction was financed by Barclays Bank, whose offices were located in the rounded section of the building facing the Old City walls. The building was designed by British architect Clifford Holliday. Stained glass windows designed by Israeli artist Avigdor Arikha were installed in the City Council Chamber in 1972.

Israeli municipality compound (1990s)
The new complex of the Jerusalem municipality was built in the 1990s in Safra Square. Offices were previously located in 32 different buildings around the city. As the site is at the historic centre of the city, various measures were taken to meet the practical needs of the town hall without damaging the architectural and historical character of the district. A number of historical buildings were renovated and two modern buildings were constructed.

Municipal seal

Shortly after the founding of Israel, then-mayor Gershon Agron of West Jerusalem initiated a design contest among local graphic designers for a municipal seal. The winning design was presented by a team led by typographer and artist Eliyahu Koren.

The seal's design consists of a shield with the Lion of Judah flanked on either side by olive branches and superimposed on a stylized background representing the Western Wall. Above the main display is the Hebrew-language word for Jerusalem.

See also
 Architecture of Israel

References

External links

Municipalities of Israel
Organizations based in Jerusalem
Buildings and structures in Jerusalem